WPCJ (91.1 FM) is a radio station licensed to Pittsford, Michigan broadcasting a religious format.

References
Michiguide.com - WPCJ History

External links

Moody Radio affiliate stations
Radio stations established in 1984
PCJ